Aren't We All? is a 1932 British comedy film directed by Harry Lachman and starring Gertrude Lawrence, Hugh Wakefield and Owen Nares. It is based on the play Aren't We All? by Frederick Lonsdale. It was made at British and Dominions Elstree Studios.

A print is preserved in the Library of Congress collection.

Cast
 Gertrude Lawrence as Margot
 Hugh Wakefield as Lord Grenham
 Owen Nares as Willie
 Wallace Geoffrey as Robert Kent
 Harold Huth as Karl Van der Hyde
 Marie Lohr as Lady Frinton
 Renee Gadd as Kitty Lake
 Emily Fitzroy as Angela
 Aubrey Mather as Vicar
 Rita Page as Cabaret Dancer  
 Maud Gill  
 Kathleen Harrison
 Eileen Munro 
 Merle Oberon

References

External links

1932 films
1932 comedy films
Films directed by Harry Lachman
British comedy films
Films shot at Imperial Studios, Elstree
British films based on plays
Paramount Pictures films
British black-and-white films
Films based on works by British writers
1930s English-language films
1930s British films